was a town located in Iruma District, Saitama Prefecture, Japan.

As of 2003, the town had an estimated population of 47,276 and a population density of 6,014.76 persons per km². The total area was 7.86 km².

On October 1, 2005, Ōi, along with the city of Kamifukuoka, was merged to create the city of Fujimino.

Dissolved municipalities of Saitama Prefecture
Fujimino, Saitama